"Lotus" is a song recorded by Japanese boy band Arashi. It was released on 23 February 2011, by their record label J Storm. The single is used as the theme song to the drama Bartender starring Arashi member Masaki Aiba. It was released in two editions: a regular edition containing two bonus tracks and instrumental versions of all the songs released in the single, and a limited edition containing a bonus track along with a DVD with a music video of the single.

On the issue dated 7 March 2012, "Lotus" debuted at number one on Japan's Oricon Singles Chart, selling 541,000 copies in its first week. According to Oricon, the single was ranked as the sixth-best-selling single in Japan for the year 2011.

Track listing

References

2011 singles
Arashi songs
Japanese television drama theme songs
Oricon Weekly number-one singles
Billboard Japan Hot 100 number-one singles
2011 songs
J Storm singles